The 2017 Nevada Wolf Pack football team represented the University of Nevada, Reno in the 2017 NCAA Division I FBS football season. The Wolf Pack were led by first–year head coach Jay Norvell and played their home games at Mackay Stadium. They were members of the West Division of the Mountain West Conference. They finished the season 3–9 and 3–5 in Mountain West play to finish in fourth place in the West Division.

Preseason

Mountain West media days
The Mountain West media days were held on July 24–26, 2017, at the Cosmopolitan in Paradise, Nevada.

Media poll
The preseason poll was released on July 25, 2017. The Wolf Pack were predicted to finish in fourth place in the MW West Division.

Preseason All–Mountain West Team
The Wolf Pack had two players selected to the preseason All–Mountain West Team; one from the offense and one from the defense.

Offense

Austin Corbett – OL

Defense

Malik Reed – DL

Schedule

Personnel

Game summaries

at Northwestern

Toledo

Idaho State

at Washington State

at Fresno State

Hawaii

at Colorado State

Air Force

at Boise State

San Jose State

at San Diego State

UNLV

Players in the 2018 NFL Draft

References

Nevada
Nevada Wolf Pack football seasons
Nevada Wolf Pack football